Chhapi railway station is a railway station in Banaskantha district, Gujarat, India on the Western line of the Western railway network. Passenger, Express and Superfast trains halt here.chhapi railway station is located in village named Chhapi

Nearby Stations

Umardashi is nearest railway station towards , whereas Dharewada is nearest railway station towards .

Major Trains

Following Express and Superfast trains halt at Chhapi railway station in both direction:

 19707/08 Bandra Terminus - Jaipur Amrapur Aravali Express
 12989/90 Dadar - Ajmer Superfast Express

References 

Railway stations in Banaskantha district
Ahmedabad railway division